Baladi cheese is a soft, white cheese originating in the Middle East. It has a mild yet rich flavor.

About
Baladi has the same size and shape as Syrian cheese with markings from the draining basket or hoop which leave a design patterned on its outer surface. It is slightly higher in fat than Syrian and its texture is softer, creamier and less chewy.

Name
Baladi is made using milk from baladi goats. The word baladi means "village" or "country". Baladi is also called the "cheese of the mountains" since it is made among high mountains by shepherds in Lebanon.

Ingredients
Baladi is a fresh, traditionally unpasteurized, and uncultured cheese made with a mixture of goat, cow and sheep's milk. The diverse microflora, high moisture, uncultured, and unpasteurized nature tends to limit the shelf life to 3 days.

See also
 Feta cheese
 List of cheeses

References

Middle Eastern cheeses
Mediterranean cuisine
Syrian cuisine
Egyptian cuisine
Lebanese cuisine
Iraqi cuisine
Palestinian cuisine
Saudi Arabian cuisine
Jordanian cuisine
Yemeni cuisine
Levantine cuisine